Osvaldo Barsottini (born 28 August 1979) is an Argentine footballer, who plays as a centre-back.

He has formerly played for clubs like Unión Española, Gimnasia de La Plata and CA Colón.

Teams

Player
Racing Club
 Argentine Primera División (1): 2001 Clausura

External links
 Profile at BDFA 
 

1981 births
Living people
Argentine footballers
Argentine expatriate footballers
Argentine Primera División players
Primera Nacional players
Independiente Rivadavia footballers
Defensores de Belgrano footballers
Club Atlético Platense footballers
San Martín de Mendoza footballers
Godoy Cruz Antonio Tomba footballers
Racing Club de Avellaneda footballers
El Porvenir footballers
Instituto footballers
Unión Española footballers
Club de Gimnasia y Esgrima La Plata footballers
Club Atlético Colón footballers
Ferro Carril Oeste footballers
Club y Biblioteca Ramón Santamarina footballers
Argentine expatriate sportspeople in Chile
Expatriate footballers in Chile
Association football defenders